Kutsenko or Kuzenko is a gender-neutral Ukrainian surname that may refer to:
Aleksei Kutsenko (born 1972), Russian football player
Gosha Kutsenko (born 1967), Russian actor, producer, singer, poet and screenwriter
Vadim Kutsenko (born 1977), Uzbekistani tennis player
Valeriy Kutsenko (born 1986), Ukrainian football player
Yakov Kutsenko (1915–1988), Ukrainian weightlifter
Yuriy Kutsenko (1952–2018), Soviet decathlete

See also
 

Ukrainian-language surnames